Stigmatoechidae is a family of bryozoans belonging to the order Cyclostomatida.

Genera:
 Hornera Lamouroux, 1821 
 Stigmatoechos Marsson, 1887

References

Cyclostomatida